Afrodacarellus bipilosus is a species of mite in the family Rhodacaridae.

This species was formerly a member of the genus Afrogamasellus.

References

Rhodacaridae
Articles created by Qbugbot
Animals described in 1979
Taxa named by Wolfgang Karg